Sharif (also spelled Sherif) is an Arabic word meaning "noble", "highborn", or "honourable", traditionally used as a title for the descendants of the family of the prophet Muhammad.

Sharif may also refer to:

Name 

Sherif or Sharif, a proper name (including a list of people with this name)

People 
 Mehrshad Sharif (born 1952), Iranian and French chess master
 Mohammed Sharif (social worker), Indian social worker
 Nawaz Sharif (born 1949), Former Prime Minister of Pakistan
 Omar Sharif (1932–2015), Egyptian film actor
 Raheel Sharif (born 1956), Pakistani retired four-star general and former Chief of Army Staff
 Talal al-Sharif, Jordanian politician both elected and expelled from office in 2013
 Sharif Finch (born 1995), American football player
 Sharif Hikmat Nashashibi co-founder and chairman of Arab Media Watch
 Sharif family, a Pakistani political family based in Punjab

Villages in Iran 
 Sharif, Ilam
 Sharif, Khuzestan

Other uses 
 Sharif of Mecca
 Sharif University of Technology in Iran

See also 
 Shareef (disambiguation)
 Mazar-i-Sharif
 Sharifabad (disambiguation)
 Sharifate of Mecca
 Sharifian (disambiguation)